Tom Carpenter (born 31 August 1887, date of death unknown) was an English player of English billiards and snooker.

Biography
Carpenter was born in August 1887, to English parents, at Newport, Wales, and later lived in Cardiff. He started playing English billiards at the age of seven, and made a  break at the age of ten.

He won the Welsh professional billiards title in 1913, beating Arthur Llewellin by 4,084 points in a match of 9,000-up. Llewellin had held the title for 22 years. Carpenter held the title until 1939, when he resigned it. In his 26-year reign as champion, he went 23 years without challenge.

Carpenter reached the semi-final of the inaugural professional World Snooker Championship in 1927. He also reached the 1928 World billiards championship semi-final. 

In January 1922 at Cardiff, Carpenter played Joe Davis in a 7,000-up game of billiards. The game ended on 21 January 1922 and Tom lost by a single point.

He coached Thelma Carpenter (no relation), who won multiple billiards titles.

Note

References 

1887 births
Date of death missing
English players of English billiards
English snooker players
Sportspeople from Newport, Wales